Ignazio Camillo Guglielmo Maria Pietro Persico (30 January 1823 – 7 December 1895) was an Italian cardinal of the Roman Catholic Church who served multiple assignments. including as vicar apostolic, bishop, apostolic delegate to Ireland, and vicar of the Roman Colleges. He briefly served as the bishop of the Diocese of Savannah in Georgia in the United States from 1870 to 1873.

Biography

Early life 
Ignzazio Persico was born on 30 January 1823 in Naples in the Kingdom of Italy. Persico entered the Capuchin Franciscan Order on 25 April 1839.  He was ordained into the priesthood in Naples for the Franciscan Order on 24 January 1846 by Bishop Gennaro Pasca.

In November, 1846, Persico was sent  to Patna in British India. Vicar Apostolic Anastasius Hartmann made him his socius and confidant. In 1850, Persico accompanied Hartmann to Bombay in what was then the Bombay Presidency of India.  Persico was then transferred to the Apostolic Vicariate of Bombay. Persico assisted Hartmann in founding a seminary in Bombay and establishing the Bombay Catholic Examiner. In 1853, the Vatican was facing a schism among Portuguese and Indian priests in Goa, a small Indian colony of the Portuguese Empire.  Hartmann sent Persico to Rome to discuss the problem with Pope Pius IX and then to London to do the same with the British Government.

Vicar Apostolic of Bombay and Agra 
Persico was appointed on 8 March 1854 as coadjutor vicar apostolic for the Apostolic Vicariate of Bombay and Titular Bishop of Gratianopolis by Pius IX.  Persico was consecrated by Bishop Hartmann on 4 June 1854.

In 1855, Persico was appointed visitor of the Apostolic Vicariate of Agra in Agra, British India.  He was later named vicar apostolic of that district. During the Indian Rebellion of 1857 against British occupation forces, Persico was several times in danger of his life, causing his health to deteriorate.  He returned in 1860 to Italy to recover. An eyewitness account he wrote of the events in Agra was published in 1858.

Later positions 
In 1866, the Vatican sent Persico to the United States to perform mission work in 1866.  While there, he participated in the Council of Baltimore.

On 11 March 1870, Persico was appointed by Pius IX as bishop of the Diocese of Savannah in the Southern United States. However, Pius IX accepted his resignation from this position due to continuing health problems on August 25, 1872. 

In 1874, Pius IX named Persico as titular bishop of Bolina and sent him to serve in Canada as an apostolic delegate. In 1877, he was sent back to India to settle a church schism.

Bishop of Sora-Cassino-Aquino-Pontecorvo 
On 15 July 1878, Persico was appointed by Pope Leo XIII as coadjutor bishop of the Diocese of Sora-Cassino-Aquino-Pontecorvo in Italy.  On 26 March 1879, Persico automatically became bishop of that diocese after the death of Bishop Paolo do Niquesa.  On 5 March 1887, Persico resigned his post.

Roman Curia 
On 14 March 1887, Leo XIII promoted Persico to the Roman Curia and appointed him as  titular archbishop of Tamiatha. 

The pope then sent Persico to serve as apostolic delegate to Ireland, then a part of the United Kingdom. The Vatican was concerned about the ties between the Irish clergy and the Irish nationalist movement. Persico quickly realized that he needed to consider the history of Ireland in addition to current politics and delayed his report to analyze it. At that time, the Irish National League was promoting the Plan of Campaign, a political strategy to force English absentee landlords to lower the rents charged to financially strapped Irish tenant farmers. 

On 23 April 1888, before Persico could complete his report, the Congregation of the Holy Office declared its opposition to the Plan of Campaign and condemned the use of boycotting by Irish activists.  In June 1888, Leo XIII issued the encyclical "Saepe Nos", reinforcing and defending this condemnation. According to author Pucell, this ruling was a surprise and disappointment for Persico:"The promulgation of the Papal Rescript, condemning boycotting and the Plan of Campaign as grave offences against the moral law, took Mgr. Persico as much by surprise as it did Cardinal Manning; for both he and the Papal Delegate confidently expected that, in accordance with their joint suggestions, the condemnation of the immoral methods of the League would have been pronounced not directly by the Holy See, but by the Irish Episcopate." (Purcell, Life of Cardinal Manning, Archbishop of Westminster, MacMillan, London, 1896, vol. II, p. 624.)  His mission in Ireland terminated, Persico returned to Rome much disappointed. He later commented, "I had no idea that anything had been done about Irish affairs, much less thought that some questions had been referred to the Holy Office, and the first knowledge I had of the decree was on the morning of the 28th April, when I received the bare circular sent me by Propaganda. I must add that had I known of such a thing I would have felt it my duty to make proper representations to the Holy See".On 16 January 1893, Persico was created cardinal priest of the title of St. Peter in Chains.Iganzio Persico died in Rome on 7 December 1895.

See also

 Catholic Church hierarchy
 Catholic Church in the United States
 Historical list of the Catholic bishops of the United States
 List of Catholic bishops of the United States

References

External links
Roman Catholic Diocese of Savanna

1823 births
1896 deaths
19th-century Italian cardinals
Cardinals created by Pope Leo XIII
Roman Catholic bishops of Savannah, Georgia
Capuchins
Italian expatriates in India
Italian expatriates in Ireland
Italian expatriates in the United States